VIRM trains, full name Verlengd InterRegio Materieel (Lengthened interregional rolling stock), are a series of electric multiple unit (EMU) double-deck trains operated by Nederlandse Spoorwegen or NS (Dutch Railways), the principal railway operator in the Netherlands. NS has 178 of these double-deckers – 98 four-carriage sets, and 80 six-carriage sets. The trains were built between 1994 and 2009 – for the most part by Talbot, part of Bombardier Inc., with some railcars built by De Dietrich.

The VIRM trains evolved out of the previously existing DD-IRM series (DubbelDeks InterRegio Materieel or Double-deck interregional rolling stock). The first batch of 81 VIRM trains was created by lengthening all the existing DD-IRM combinations by one or two railcars. Three-unit trainsets were augmented by one carriage to transform them into a four-unit VIRM, and the four-unit sets received two more carriages, to create six-unit VIRM trains.

Names
 VIRM (Verlengd InterRegio Materieel)
 DD-IRM (Dubbeldeksinterregiomaterieel)
 Regiorunner (express train, never used)

First generation
The first generation of DD-IRM were delivered from 1994 to 1996 as three and four car units. The three car units were delivered in the 82xx class and the four car units delivered as 84xx. The first batch of 290 double deck coaches (individual) were delivered. The first 47 were built by De Dietrich and from then on by Talbot.

As the coaches were individual but would run as a unit, they are individually numbered. Collectively they have a set number e.g., 8201, having coach number 380 8001. However, there are no double numbers, for example there can not be an 8201 and 8401 at the same time.

In 2000 an order was placed for new coaches. The 3 car sets were to be upgraded to 4 car sets, and the four car sets upgraded to 6 car sets. This is why they are now called VIRM (V = verlengd – extended). These were renumbered into the 94xx series and the 86xx series. These sets were formed between 2001 and 2005.

Second and third generation

The second and third generation of VIRM were new sets built to the 4 and 6 coach formations, at the same time as the first generation were rebuilt. These were numbered 95xx (4 car units) and 87xx (6 car units). These sets featured different seats, which were also in the new coaches placed inside the first generation sets.

Fourth generation
These sets were delivered from June 2008 and these are all 4 car units. They are numbered 9547–9597. These sets differ in that they do not feature the catering lift, meaning the stairs could be wider and the destination screens inside the coaches have disappeared, where instead information screens with travel information have been fitted.

Refurbishment 

Starting in 2015, the VIRM-1 sets were being refurbished and fitted with new interiors similar to those seen in the DDZ trainsets, and with new-style liveries. These sets are officially referred to as VIRMm1.

Numbering

 34 trainsets in 9401–9481, no double numbering with 47 trainsets in 8601–8681
 12 trainsets 8701...8723 only odd numbers plus 13 trainsets 9502...9525 remaining numbers
 mBvk1/2 8755–8758 are reserve carbodies, 8755 has become replacement 8718
 mBvk1/2 8829 was built as a replacement vehicle for an older trainset

Different liveries

 8707 – This carried adverts for Lekker lezen boven in de trein, Comfortable reading in the upper deck of the train, for a short period in 2016. The adverts were removed because it was said they were not fireproof enough.

 8733 – This featured adverts between the two decks, advertising that it was the 300th VIRM set built. Livery no longer carried.

 8741 – This is the prototype for the midlife-revision of the VIRM-2/3 series.

 9411 – This is the prototype for the midlife-revision of the VIRM-1 series.

 9514 – This carries adverts for Lekker lezen in de trein, Comfortable reading in the train.

 9520 – This carried an orange/blue livery advertising Queen Beatrix Wilhelmina Armgard resigning from the throne.

 9522 – This sported a white/magenta livery advertising the OV-Chipkaart.

 9524 – This carried advertising liveries for Mamma Mia and The Lion King. As well as that, it sported a completely white/magenta livery, advertising the OV-chipkaart similar to unit no. 9522.

 9525 – This carried the adverts for the NS/Olympic partnership.

 9556 – This carries a blue/yellow dotted livery on the middle of the train which makes it look like it is green, it is called the "Groene trein", Green train, for advertising the cooperation between NS and Eneco. Livery was designed by two students.

Services operated
The VIRM is now the main intercity train and can be seen across most of the NS network.

Green train
In 2015, NS hopes to let 50% of their trains run on electricity powered by windmills. By 2018, all the trains should be running on "clean" electricity. To celebrate this and the fact that the first Dutch railway line was opened 175 years ago, NS and Eneco Energy held a competition. Designers had to design a green train.

The winners were two students from the Technical University in Delft. Their names are Michiel van Sinderen and Steffen de Jonge. Their design was to have the train be checkered with small black and blue squares. From even a small distance the train appears to be green. Michiel van Sinderen said it was the most beautiful thing he had ever made.
This design was brought on VIRM number 9556. It was named De Groene Trein which means The Green Train. The difference between this train and other VIRMs is the paler shade of yellow and white arrows on the doors, similar to those on DDZ trains and modernized ICRm railway cars.
 
The train debuted on September 20, 2014. Its maiden voyage was an extra trip from Amsterdam Centraal to Haarlem. Now it can be spotted and ridden anywhere in the Netherlands.

Accidents and incidents

On 21 April 2012, unit 8711 was one of the two trains involved in a head-on collision near  station.

On 28 April 2017, a VIRM unit collided with a lorry on a level crossing at Wouw and was derailed.

Gallery

References

External links

 https://web.archive.org/web/20141106172520/http://www.ns.nl/over-ns/campagnes/maatschappelijk-betrokken/de-groene-trein.html

Electric multiple units of the Netherlands
Waggonfabrik Talbot
De Dietrich Ferroviaire
Double-decker EMUs
1500 V DC multiple units of the Netherlands
Bombardier Transportation multiple units